Category 4 or Category IV may refer to:

 Category 4 cable, a cable that consists of four unshielded twisted-pair wires
 Category 4 fireworks, British fireworks that are for sale only to professionals
 Category 4 tropical cyclone, on any of the Tropical cyclone scales
 Any of several hurricanes listed at list of Category 4 Atlantic hurricanes or list of Category 4 Pacific hurricanes
 Category 4 pandemic, on the Pandemic Severity Index, an American influenza pandemic with a case-fatality ratio between 1% and 2%
 Category 4 winter storm, on the Northeast Snowfall Impact Scale and the Regional Snowfall Index
 Any of several winter storms listed at list of Northeast Snowfall Impact Scale winter storms and list of Regional Snowfall Index Category 4 winter storms
 Category 04 non-silicate mineral - oxides
 Category four stadium, a football stadium of the highest quality as ranked by the UEFA
 Category IV New Testament manuscripts - Western
 Category IV measurement - performed at the source of the low-voltage installation
 Category IV vintage car condition - Very good
 Category IV Armed Forces Qualification Test scores - 10-30 (further subdivided)
 Category IV protected area (IUCN) - Habitat/Species Management Area

See also 
 Class 4 (disambiguation) - class/category equivalence (for labeling)
 Type 4 (disambiguation) - type/category equivalence (for labeling)
 Group 4 (disambiguation) - group/category equivalence (for labeling)